The Coronation Oath Act 1688 (1 Will & Mary c 6) is an Act of the Parliament of England. It was passed in 1689 (New Style; 1688 Old Style).

The preamble noted that "by the Law and Ancient Usage of this Realm" the monarchs of England had taken a solemn oath at their coronation to maintain the statute laws and customs of the country and of its inhabitants, but the text of this oath had become partly meaningless over time, "framed in doubtful Words and Expressions with relation to ancient Laws and Constitutions at this time unknown". It established a single uniform oath to be taken by future monarchs at their coronation, and also established that this oath was to be taken by William III and Mary II when they were crowned.

The oath was fundamentally different from the traditional coronation oath which recognized laws as being the grant of the king whereas the Act's oath sought to bind the king to rule according to the law agreed in Parliament. The oath was shorter than the one used in 1660, removing a number of awkward phrases and references to past monarchs; a significant alteration was the explicit inclusion of an oath to maintain "the true Profession of the Gospel and the Protestant Reformed Religion Established by Law", rather than the somewhat more vague promise to "Protect and Defend the Bishops and Churches under [my] Government."

Section 2 of the Act of Settlement 1701 reiterated the oath. This Act mostly remains in force . (Section 4, from "bee it" to "enacted that" was repealed by section 1(1) of, and Part I of the Schedule to, the Statute Law Revision Act 1888.)

The Scottish Claim of Right Act 1689 says that the monarch cannot "exercise the regal power until he or she swear the Coronation Oath."

See also
 Accession Declaration Act 1910

References

The Law & Working of the Constitution: Documents 1660-1914, ed. W. C. Costin & J. Steven Watson. A&C Black, 1952. Vol. I (1660-1783), p. 57-9. (This includes a copy of the text of the oath as used in 1660, given for comparison)

External links

House of Commons Library (2008) The Coronation Oath, Standard Note SN/PC/00435.
Image of the Act on the UK Parliamentary website

1688 in law
1688 in England
Acts of the Parliament of England
Acts of the Parliament of England still in force
Oaths of allegiance